The 2022 BC Lions season was the 64th season for the team in the Canadian Football League (CFL) and their 68th overall. The Lions improved upon their  record from 2021, with their sixth win in their seventh game. The team then qualified for the playoffs following losses by both the Hamilton Tiger-Cats and the Ottawa Redblacks, in week 16, on September 24, 2022. The Lions clinched a home playoff game on October 22, 2022, for the first time since the 2016 season, following their Week 20 win over the Edmonton Elks. However, after defeating the Calgary Stampeders in the West Semi-Final, the team lost to the Winnipeg Blue Bombers in the West Final.

The 2022 season was the second season with Rick Campbell as the team's head coach and the second season with Campbell and Neil McEvoy as co-general managers.

Offseason

CFL Global Draft
The 2022 CFL Global Draft took place on May 3, 2022. With the format being a snake draft, the Lions selected third in the odd-numbered rounds and seventh in the even-numbered rounds.

CFL National Draft
The 2022 CFL Draft took place on May 3, 2022. The Lions had the third selection in each of the eight rounds of the draft after recording the third-worst record in 2021. The Lions obtained another third-round pick after trading the rights for Sergio Castillo to the Winnipeg Blue Bombers.

Preseason

Schedule

 Games played with colour uniforms.

Regular season

Standings

Schedule

 Games played with colour uniforms.
 Games played with white uniforms.
 Games played with alternate uniforms.

Post-season

Schedule 

 Games played with white uniforms.
 Games played with alternate uniforms.

Team

Roster

Coaching staff

References

External links
 

BC Lions seasons
BC Lions
BC Lions season